Oregon Trail Academy is a K–12 school in Boring, Oregon. It is part of the Oregon Trail School District. It is an International Baccalaureate school.

External links

Schools in Clackamas County, Oregon
2009 establishments in Oregon